The 1999 U.S. Men's Clay Court Championships was an Association of Tennis Professionals tennis tournament held in Orlando, United States. It was the 31st edition of the tournament and was held from April 19 to April 26. Magnus Norman won the singles title. Eighth-seeded Magnus Norman won the singles title.

Finals

Singles

 Magnus Norman defeated  Guillermo Cañas, 6–0, 6–3.
 It was Norman's 1st title of the year and the 3rd of his career.

Doubles

 Jim Courier /  Todd Woodbridge defeated  Bob Bryan /  Mike Bryan, 7–6(7–4), 6–4.
 It was Courier's only title of the year and the 29th of his career. It was Woodbridge's 1st title of the year and the 59th of his career.

References